Phyllis (minor planet designation: 556 Phyllis) is a minor planet orbiting the Sun. It is an S-type asteroid with a diameter of 38 km and a geometric albedo of 0.185. Based on photometric observations between 1998 and 2006, it has a synodic rotation period of 4.293 ± 0.001 hours. The asteroid is named after Phyllis, a character in Greek mythology.

References

External links
 
 

Vesta asteroids
Phyllis
Phyllis
S-type asteroids (Tholen)
S-type asteroids (SMASS)
19050108